Wayne Swart is a South African rugby union player.

In 2008, he was included in the Vodacom Cup squad. He represented the team several times in this competition, as well as the Currie Cup competition, but failed to make the breakthrough into the Super Rugby squad.

He joined  for the 2012 Vodacom Cup season.

References

South African rugby union players
Eastern Province Elephants players
Golden Lions players
Rugby union players from Johannesburg
Living people
1986 births
Rugby union props